Loch Shin is a loch in the Scottish North West Highlands. To the south is the small town of Lairg.

Around the loch there are mountain ranges; the  Ben More Assynt in the west and Ben Klibreck to the east. The loch drains to the North Sea by way of the short River Shin that feeds into the Dornoch Firth at Bonar Bridge.

Three miles to the north of Lairg is a monument in remembrance of an early attempt to tame the Highlands. The area around the loch is a centre for sheep farming in Scotland.

References

Sources

External links
Tour Loch Shin
Loch Shin Hydro Scheme
Hydro Scotland

Shin
Landforms of Sutherland
LShin
Lochs of Sutherland